Haji Saleh Mohammad was selected to represent Kunar Province in Afghanistan's Meshrano Jirga, the upper house of its National Legislature, in 2005.
A report on Kunar prepared at the Navy Postgraduate School stated that he was "affiliated with Sedaqat".
He was the chair of the Armed Services Committee.

References

Politicians of Kunar Province
Living people
Members of the House of Elders (Afghanistan)
Year of birth missing (living people)